Morgan Scott Burns (born May 19, 1993) is a former American football cornerback for the Kansas State Wildcats. In 2015, he won the Big 12 Special Teams Player of the Year. He signed a contract with the Tennessee Titans as a free agent as of April 30, 2016. He subsequently retired from professional football to pursue a career in the ministry. He formerly worked at City Life in Wichita, Kansas, as a youth pastor, but has recently started his own church.

References

1993 births
Living people
American football defensive backs
Kansas State Wildcats football players
Sportspeople from Overland Park, Kansas
Players of American football from Kansas